Kirill Yevgenyevich Orlov (born 18 January 1983) is a Russian former professional footballer.

Club career
He made his debut in the Russian Premier League in 2001 for FC Torpedo-ZIL Moscow.

References

1983 births
Living people
Russian footballers
Russia youth international footballers
Russia under-21 international footballers
Association football defenders
FC Moscow players
FC Rostov players
FC Khimki players
FC Sibir Novosibirsk players
Russian Premier League players
FC Salyut Belgorod players
FC Sokol Saratov players